Allen F. Jacobson (1927-2012) was an American chemical engineer and researcher who was a member of the National Academy of Engineering and chief executive officer of 3M.

Life and career
Jacobson studied and graduated with a bachelor's degree in chemical engineering at the Iowa State University in 1947.

In 1947, Jacobson joined 3M as a chemical engineer, working in 3M’s Scotch tape laboratory.

In 1984, Jacobson was named as the president of Minnesota Mining and Manufacturing Company. Between 1986 and 1991, he was the chief executive officer of 3M. During his time with 3M, he increased the company income by growing in new fields such as magnetic media. 

In 1991, Jacobson was elected as a member of the National Academy of Engineering.

Allen Jacobson chemical engineering lab at the Iowa State University is named after him.

References

1927 births
2012 deaths
3M people